The 2023 Kiskút Open was a professional tennis tournament played on indoor clay courts. It was the first edition of the tournament which was part of the 2023 ATP Challenger Tour. It took place in Székesfehérvár, Hungary between 13 and 19 March 2023.

Singles main draw entrants

Seeds

 1 Rankings are as of 6 March 2023.

Other entrants
The following players received wildcards into the singles main draw:
  Péter Fajta
  Matyas Füle
  Gergely Madarász

The following player received entry into the singles main draw as an alternate:
  Salvatore Caruso

The following players received entry from the qualifying draw:
  Mirza Bašić
  Elliot Benchetrit
  Benjamin Hassan
  Gerald Melzer
  Julian Ocleppo
  Oleg Prihodko

Champions

Singles

  Hamad Međedović def.  Nino Serdarušić 6–4, 6–3.

Doubles

  Bogdan Bobrov /  Sergey Fomin def.  Sarp Ağabigün /  Ergi Kırkın 6–2, 5–7, [11–9].

References

Kiskút Open
2023 in Hungarian sport
March 2023 sports events in Hungary